Dmitriyevo is a rural locality (a village) in Danilovskoye Rural Settlement, Melenkovsky District, Vladimir Oblast, Russia. The population was 12 as of 2010.

Geography 
Dmitriyevo is located on the Charmus River, 44 km west of Melenki (the district's administrative centre) by road. Vasilyevsky is the nearest rural locality.

References 

Rural localities in Melenkovsky District